Tepehua may refer to:

 Tepehuas, indigenous people of Mexico
 Tepehua languages, belonging to Totonacan languages
 Tepehuán language, belonging to Uto-Aztecan languages

Language and nationality disambiguation pages